Warden Peak is a mountain on Vancouver Island, British Columbia, Canada, located  north of Gold River and  north of Victoria Peak.

Warden Peak is part of the Vancouver Island Ranges which in turn form part of the Insular Mountains.

See also
 Geography of British Columbia

References

Vancouver Island Ranges
One-thousanders of British Columbia
Rupert Land District